Margaret Rwabushaija (born 12 August 1956) is a member of the Ugandan Parliament and Workers Representative at the National level and a teacher by profession. She is an Independent politician.

Educational background 
In 1969, she completed her Primary Leaving Examinations from Namukozi Primary School and later joined Namasagali College for Uganda Certificate of Education in 1975. In the same year (1975), she completed East African Certificate of Education from Kamuli Parents Secondary School and joined Makerere University to pursue her bachelor's degree in arts in 1979. In the same year (1979), she returned to Makerere University to obtained a Diploma in Education. In 2001, she was awarded a Postgraduate Diploma in Management from Uganda Management Institute. Margaret returned to Uganda Management Institute in 2008 for Masters of Management Studies.

Career journey 
Between 2009 - 2015, she served as the Deputy Head Teacher at Kitante Hill School, and Lubiri Secondary School( in 1998 - 2008). She taught at several schools such as Mengo Senior School (1981-1983), City High School(1984 -1997), and Kitante Hill School (1979 -1980).

Political career 
From 2016 to 2021, she was the Member of Parliament at the Parliament of Uganda in the 10th parliament.

She served on the Professional Body as the full member at Uganda National Teachers Union, Commonwealth Teachers Group and Forum for East African Teachers Union. She also served on additional role as the Member on Committee on Education and Sports.

Personal life 
She is married. Her hobbies are Sports and reading.

See also 

 List of members of the tenth Parliament of Uganda
 Parliament of Uganda
 Member of Parliament

External links 

 Website of the Parliament of Uganda
 Margaret Rwabushaija on Twitter
 Margaret Rwabushaija on Linkedin

References 

Living people
1956 births
Independent politicians
Members of the Parliament of Uganda
Women members of the Parliament of Uganda
Makerere University alumni